Entropia may mean:

 Entropia Universe (formerly known as Project Entropia), a popular MMORPG-style online virtual universe.
 Entropia, Inc. (company), a defunct company that produced commercial distributed computing software.
 Entropia (album), a music album by the Swedish progressive metal band, Pain of Salvation.
 Entropa, a satirical art installation depicting member countries of the European Union

See also
 Entropy (disambiguation)